Progress M-MIM2, or Progress M-MRM2, originally designated Progress M-SO2, was a modified Progress-M 11F615A55, Russian production No. 302, which was used to deliver the Poisk module to the International Space Station. It has the pressurised cargo module removed to accommodate Poisk. It was similar to the Progress M-SO1 spacecraft which was used to deliver the Pirs module to the station in 2001.

Launch

Progress M-MIM2 and Poisk were launched by a Soyuz-U carrier rocket flying from Site 1/5 at the Baikonur Cosmodrome. The launch occurred at 14:22 GMT on 10 November 2009.

Docking

The spacecraft docked with the zenith port of the International Space Station's Zvezda module on 12 November. Capture occurred at 15:41 GMT, and initial docking was completed successfully at 15:44.

Undocking and Decay

At 00:16 GMT on 8 December, Progress M-MIM2 was undocked from Poisk, and at 04:48 GMT its engines ignited to begin a 38-second deorbit burn. It reentered the atmosphere over the Pacific Ocean at 05:27, and had broken up by 05:32.

See also

List of Progress flights
Uncrewed spaceflights to the International Space Station
 Progress M-UM

References

Spacecraft launched in 2009
Progress (spacecraft) missions
Spacecraft which reentered in 2009